Clifton Durett Taylor Jr. is a former running back in the National Football League. He was drafted by the Chicago Bears in the third round of the 1974 NFL Draft and played that season with the team. After a year away from the NFL, he played with the Green Bay Packers during the 1976 NFL season.

References

Players of American football from Memphis, Tennessee
Chicago Bears players
Green Bay Packers players
American football running backs
Memphis Tigers football players
1952 births
Living people